Heavy Petting is a 1989 documentary directed by Obie Benz and Joshua Waletzky.

Overview
Celebrities reveal their first sexual experiences.

References

External links

1989 films
Documentary films about sexuality
1989 documentary films
American documentary films
1980s English-language films
1980s American films